Apoctena flavescens is a species of moth of the  family Tortricidae. It is found in New Zealand, where it is found on both the North and South islands.

The larvae are polyphagous.

References

Moths described in 1877
Epitymbiini
Moths of New Zealand
Endemic fauna of New Zealand
Taxa named by Arthur Gardiner Butler
Endemic moths of New Zealand